Orellia falcata is a species of tephritid  or fruit flies in the family Tephritidae.

Distribution
This species is present in most of Europe, in the eastern Palearctic realm, and in the Near East.

Description
Wings have characteristic dark bands, the second and third bands are not fused along the anterior alar margin. Eyes are bright green. Head is yellow, while thorax and abdomen are pale green. Scutellum shows four black spots at the basis of setae. Cephalic and thoracic setae are black.

Biology
Adults can be found from May to July. Females lay their eggs in holes on the host plant. Larvae live in root crown of Tragopogon pratensis.

References

Tephritinae
Taxa named by Giovanni Antonio Scopoli
Insects described in 1763
Diptera of Asia
Diptera of Europe